SMS Kronprinzessin Erzherzogin Stephanie was an ironclad warship built for the Austro-Hungarian Navy in the 1880s, the last vessel of that type to be built for Austria-Hungary. The ship, named for Archduchess Stephanie, Crown Princess of Austria, was laid down in November 1884, was launched in April 1887 and completed in July 1889. Her service was limited, in large part due to the rapid pace of naval development in the 1890s, which quickly rendered her obsolescent. As a result, her career was generally limited to routine training and the occasional visit to foreign countries. In 1897, she took part in an international naval demonstration to force a compromise over Greek and Ottoman claims to the island of Crete. Kronprinzessin Erzherzogin Stephanie was decommissioned in 1905, hulked in 1910, and converted into a barracks ship in 1914. After Austria-Hungary's defeat in World War I, the ship was transferred to Italy as a war prize and was eventually broken up for scrap in 1926.

Design

In the decades that followed the Austrian victory at the Battle of Lissa in 1866, naval expenditure in the Austro-Hungarian Empire were drastically reduced, in large part due to the veto power the Hungarian half of the empire held. Surrounded by potentially hostile countries powers on land, the Austro-Hungarian Empire was more concerned with these threats, and so naval development was not prioritized. Admiral Friedrich von Pöck argued for several years to improve the strength of the Austro-Hungarian fleet, finally winning authorization to build the center battery ship  in 1875. He spent another six years trying in vain to secure a sister ship to Tegetthoff. In 1881, he called for a fleet of eleven armored warships. Pöck's successor, Maximilian Daublebsky von Sterneck, ultimately had to resort to budgetary sleight of hand, appropriating funds that had been allocated to modernize the ironclad  to build an entirely new vessel. He attempted to conceal the deception by referring to the ship officially as Ferdinand Max, though the actual Ferdinand Max was still anchored in Pola as a school ship.

According to Conway's All the World's Fighting Ships, the design for the new ship was prepared by Josef Kuchinka, the Director of Naval Construction for the Austro-Hungarian Navy, but the naval historian R. F. Scheltema de Heere credits the naval engineer Moriz Soyka with the work. A second ship, was authorized at the same time. The ships were broadly similar, though Kronprinzessin Erzherzogin Stephanie was significantly smaller and carried one less main battery gun compared to the other vessel. Chronically starved of funding, the navy was forced to accept significant compromises in the size—and therefore capabilities—of Kronprinz Erzherzog Rudolf and Kronprinzessin Erzherzogin Stephanie, particularly compared to the far larger and more heavily armed Amiral Duperré that inspired their design. Scheltema de Heere severely criticized the decision to build two ships of markedly different size and power at the same time, stating "Either you need three guns or you can do with two, but one unit larger than the other is nonsense."

General characteristics and machinery
Her draft ranged from  empty, to  normally, and to  fully laden. Her hull was constructed with transverse and longitudinal steel frames and was extensively subdivided into watertight compartments to improve the ship's resistance to flooding. The ship was equipped with a ram bow that was manufactured in Germany by Krupp. Kronprinzessin Erzherzogin Stephanie had a short forecastle deck and a raised sterncastle, and a relatively small superstructure that consisted of a conning tower with a bridge atop it. She was fitted with two pole masts equipped with fighting tops for some of her light guns. Her crew number 430 officers and enlisted men.

The number and type of the coal-fired boilers that provided steam for the engines have not survived, though they were trunked into two funnels.

Armament and armor

Kronprinzessin Erzherzogin Stephanie was armed with a main battery of two  35-caliber guns mounted singly in an open barbette. They were placed forward in sponsons over the battery deck to maximize end-on fire. While the open barbettes provided a wide field of fire for the slow-firing guns, they were rapidly rendered obsolete by the proliferation of rapid-firing light guns, originally intended as defenses against torpedo boats, but were quickly put to use to attack unprotected gun crews. Further, quick-firing (QF) technology was soon to be applied to large-caliber artillery pieces. Each gun had a stock of 68 shells.

The main battery was supported by a secondary battery of six  35-caliber guns, also built by Krupp. These were mounted in gun ports amidships, three on each side, and they were supplied with a total of 408 shells. She carried nine  QF guns for close-range defense against torpedo boats; seven were 44-caliber guns and the other two were shorter 33-caliber pieces, all built by Hotchkiss. Her gun armament was rounded out by a pair of  44-caliber QF guns and a pair of  15-caliber landing guns for use by landing parties. As was customary for capital ships of the period, she carried four  torpedo tubes; one was mounted in the bow, another in the stern, and one on each broadside.

Kronprinzessin Erzherzogin Stephanie was protected with compound armor manufactured by the Dillinger Hütte works in Germany. The ship was protected by an armored belt that consisted of three strakes of armor plate along the length of the hull. The aft section of belt consisted of a  upper strake and two  strakes below.

Service history

Kronprinzessin Erzherzogin Stephanie was built by the Stabilimento Tecnico Triestino shipyard in Trieste. Her keel was laid down on 12 November 1884, the last ironclad to be laid down for the Austro-Hungarian Navy. She was launched on 14 April 1887 and completed in July 1889. She was commissioned for sea trials on 11 July. The following year, the German emperor, Kaiser Wilhelm II, invited the Austro-Hungarian fleet to take part in the annual fleet training exercises in August. Kronprinzessin Erzherzogin Stephanie, the ironclad Kronprinz Erzherzog Rudolf, and the protected cruiser  were sent to Germany under the command of Rear Admiral Johann von Hinke. While en route, the squadron made visits in Gibraltar and Britain; during the latter stop, the ships took part in the Cowes Regatta, where they were reviewed by Queen Victoria. The ships also stopped in Copenhagen, Denmark and Karlskrona, Sweden. During the voyage back to Austria-Hungary, the squadron visited Cherbourg, France and Palermo, Italy.

Celebrations to honor the 400th anniversary of Christopher Columbus's first trans-Atlantic voyage were held in several countries; Kronprinzessin Erzherzogin Stephanie, Kronprinz Erzherzog Rudolf, and Kaiser Franz Joseph I represented Austria-Hungary during the ceremonies in Genoa, Italy, Columbus's birthplace.

In February 1897, Kronprinzessin Erzherzogin Stephanie deployed to Crete to serve in the International Squadron, a multinational force made up of ships of the Austro-Hungarian Navy, French Navy, Imperial German Navy, Italian Royal Navy (Regia Marina), Imperial Russian Navy, and British Royal Navy that intervened in the 1897–1898 Greek uprising on Crete against rule by the Ottoman Empire. The International Squadron operated off Crete until December 1898, but Austria-Hungary, displeased with the decision to create an autonomous Cretan State under the suzerainty of the Ottoman Empire, withdrew its ships in March 1898.

By 1898, the Austro-Hungarian Navy regarded Kronprinzessin Erzherzogin Stephanie as a second-rate vessel after less than 10 years in service. The rapid pace of naval development in the late 19th century had quickly rendered her obsolescent. She was decommissioned in 1905, and in 1908, the Austro-Hungarian Navy attempted to sell the ship, Kronprinz Erzherzog Rudolf, and Tegetthoff to Uruguay in an attempt to raise funds for new projects, but the deal fell through. In 1910, she was hulked and became a barracks ship for the mine warfare school in 1914, and served in this role for the duration of World War I. Following the conclusion of the conflict in 1918, Kronprinzessin Erzherzogin Stephanie was ceded to Italy as a war prize in 1920 and eventually broken up for scrap in 1926.

Notes

References
 
 
 
 
 
 

Ironclad warships of the Austro-Hungarian Navy
1887 ships